Lothar Linke (23 October 1909 – 14 May 1943) was a German Luftwaffe night fighter pilot and recipient of the Knight's Cross of the Iron Cross during World War II. Linke claimed 27 aerial victories, 24 of them at night. On 14 May 1943 Linke and his crew were forced to bail out after engine failure of their Messerschmitt Bf 110. He struck the tail end of the plane and was killed. On 19 September 1943, he was posthumously awarded the Knight's Cross.

Early life and career
Linke was born on 23 October 1909 in Liegnitz, present-day Legnica, at the time in the Province of Silesia of the German Empire. He was the son of a train driver who had died in 1924. Linke attended the Volksschule (elementary school) in Liegnitz from 1916 to 1919 and the Oberrealschule (secondary school) from 1919 to 1927, also in Liegnitz. From April 1927 to April 1928, he then attended a private school in Liegnitz. Linke joined the military service on 1 March 1934, serving with the 3. Eskadron (3rd squadron) of the Fahr-Abteilung (driving department) in Rendsburg.

Linke transferred to the Luftwaffe and on 24 July 1939 was posted to 3. Staffel (3rd squadron) of Zerstörergeschwader 76 (ZG 76—76th Destroyer Wing). At the time, the Staffel was commanded by Hauptmann Josef Gutmann and was subordinated to I. Gruppe (1st group) of ZG 76 headed by Hauptmann Günther Reinicke. Based in Olmütz, present-day Olomouc in the Czech Republic, the Gruppe was equipped with the Messerschmitt Bf 110 heavy fighter. Linke was promoted to Feldwebel (sergeant) of the Reserves on 25 August 1939.

World War II
World War II in Europe began on Friday 1 September 1939 when German forces invaded Poland. On 19 April 1940, Linke contributed to the destruction of the Bristol Blenheim bomber P4906 from No. 107 Squadron. The bomber was on a mission to Stavanger, Norway and was shot down. Linke was promoted to Oberfeldwebel (staff or master sergeant) of the Reserves on 1 July 1940.

Night fighter career

Following the 1939 aerial Battle of the Heligoland Bight, Royal Air Force (RAF) attacks shifted to the cover of darkness, initiating the Defence of the Reich campaign. By mid-1940, Generalmajor (Brigadier General) Josef Kammhuber had established a night air defense system dubbed the Kammhuber Line. It consisted of a series of control sectors equipped with radars and searchlights and an associated night fighter. Each sector named a Himmelbett (canopy bed) would direct the night fighter into visual range with target bombers. In 1941, the Luftwaffe started equipping night fighters with airborne radar such as the Lichtenstein radar. This airborne radar did not come into general use until early 1942.

With the expansion of the night fighter force, a newly formed II. Gruppe (2nd group) of Nachtjagdgeschwader 1 (NJG 1—1st Night Fighter Wing) was created from I. Gruppe of ZG 76 on 7 September 1940. In consequence, Linke became a night fighter pilot with II. Gruppe of NJG 1, serving with 6. Staffel. On 18 January 1941, Linke's commanding officer, Oberleutnant Helmut Lent, nominated Linke for a promotion to Leutnant (second lientenant). The nomination was supported by the Gruppenkommandeur (group commander) of II. Gruppe, Hauptmann Walter Ehle, and the Geschwaderkommodore (wing commander) of NJG 1, Major Wolfgang Falck. On 1 March 1941, the nomination was approved by the Luftwaffe Personnel Office and Linke became an officer.

Linke claimed his first nocturnal aerial victory on the night of 11/12 May 1941 over a Vickers Wellington bomber. On 1 November 1941, II. Gruppe of Nachtjagdgeschwader 2 (NJG 2—2nd Night Fighter Wing) was formed from 4. Staffel of NJG 2 and transfers from 4. and 6. Staffel of NJG 1. In consequence, Linke's Staffel became the 5. Staffel of NJG 2.

On 1 October 1942. II. Gruppe of NJG 2 became IV. Gruppe of NJG 1. Linke was appointed Staffelkapitän (squadron leader) of the 12. Staffel of NJG 1 on 27 February 1943. He succeeded Hauptmann Ludwig Becker who had been killed in action the day before. The Staffel was subordinated to IV. Gruppe of NJG 1 commanded by then Major Lent.

On 14 May 1943, Linke was killed in a flying accident when his Bf 110 G-4 (Werknummer 4857—factory number) suffered engine failure. He and his radio operator Oberfeldwebel Walter Czybulka bailed out. While Czybulka landed with some injuries, Linke collided with the tail section of his aircraft and was killed. Posthumously, Linke was awarded the Knight's Cross of the Iron Cross on 19 September 1943. Linke is buried at the German War Cemetery Ysselsteyn (Block AR—Row 4—Grave 92) at Venray.

Summary of career

Aerial victory claims
According to Spick, Linke was credited with 27 aerial claimed in over 100 combat missions. This number includes 24 aerial victories claimed during nocturnal combat missions and three during daytime operations. Foreman, Parry and Mathews, authors of Luftwaffe Night Fighter Claims 1939 – 1945, researched the German Federal Archives and found records for 25 nocturnal victory claims, not documenting those aerial victories claimed as a Zerstörer pilot. Mathews and Foreman also published Luftwaffe Aces – Biographies and Victory Claims, listing Drewes with 27 claims, including two as a Zerstörer pilot.

Awards
 Iron Cross (1939) 2nd and 1st Class
 Honor Goblet of the Luftwaffe on 25 January 1943 as Leutnant and pilot
 German Cross in Gold on 12 April 1943 as Leutnant in the 12./Nachtjagdgeschwader 1
 Knight's Cross of the Iron Cross on 19 September 1943 as Oberleutnant and Staffelführer of the 12./Nachtjagdgeschwader 1

Notes

References

Citations

Bibliography

 
 
 
 
 
 
 
 
 
 
 
 
 
 
 
 
 
 
 
 
 
 
 
 
 
 
 
 
 
 
 
 
 
 

1909 births
1943 deaths
People from Legnica
Luftwaffe pilots
German World War II flying aces
Luftwaffe personnel killed in World War II
Recipients of the Gold German Cross
Recipients of the Knight's Cross of the Iron Cross
Burials at Ysselsteyn German war cemetery
People from the Province of Silesia
Aviators killed in aviation accidents or incidents